Mihai Cojusea (born 12 August 1978, Comrat, Moldavian SSR) is a Moldavian football striker who plays for CF Gagauziya.

Club statistics
Total matches played in Moldavian First League: 37 matches – 19 goals

References

External links

Profile at Divizia Nationala

1978 births
People from Comrat
Moldovan footballers
Living people
Association football forwards
Gagauziya-Oguzsport players